Cahuzac is the name or part of the name of the following communes in France:

 Cahuzac, Aude, in the Aude department
 Cahuzac, Lot-et-Garonne, in the Lot-et-Garonne department
 Cahuzac, Tarn, in the Tarn department
 Cahuzac-sur-Adour, in the Gers department
 Cahuzac-sur-Vère, in the Tarn department

People named Cahuzac:
 Jérôme Cahuzac, French cosmetic surgeon and politician
 Louis Cahuzac, French clarinetist and composer
 Pierre Cahuzac, French professional football player 
 Yannick Cahuzac, French professional football player

 See also
 Louis de Cahusac (1706–1759), French playwright and librettist, fellow worker of the composer Jean-Philippe Rameau.